Ana Sofía Sánchez Palau (born 13 April 1994) is a Mexican tennis player.

Sánchez has won 13 singles and 10 doubles titles on the ITF Women's Circuit.

Her best result so far on the WTA Tour in singles came when she reached the second round at the Monterrey Open in 2018. She beat Usue Maitane Arconada in the first round, before losing to Sachia Vickery.

In doubles, she reached the semifinal in Florianopolis in August 2016 with partner Montserrat González. The pair lost to third-seeded Tímea Babos and Réka Luca Jani, in straight sets.

On 28 June 2021, she reached her best singles ranking of world No. 248. On 15 August 2016, she peaked at No. 221 in the WTA doubles rankings.

In 2012, Sánchez made her debut for the Mexico Fed Cup team.

Grand Slam singles performance timeline

ITF Circuit finals

Singles: 25 (13 titles, 12 runner–ups)

Doubles: 27 (10 titles, 17 runner–ups)

Fed Cup/Billie Jean King Cup participation

Singles

References
 
 
 

1994 births
Living people
People from San Luis Potosí City
Mexican female tennis players
Sportspeople from San Luis Potosí
Pan American Games competitors for Mexico
Tennis players at the 2015 Pan American Games
Central American and Caribbean Games gold medalists for Mexico
Competitors at the 2014 Central American and Caribbean Games
Central American and Caribbean Games medalists in tennis
20th-century Mexican women
21st-century Mexican women